D21 – Janeček method, also known as Democracy 2.1, is an approval voting electoral system for single-winner voting, which giving each voter multiple 'positive' and 'negative' votes. It is similar to cumulative voting and combined approval voting. The method is named after its founder, Karel Janeček.

This voting method has not yet been used in any general elections. It has been used in several participatory budgeting programs conducted by cities, including for New York City.

Background 
The D21 – Janeček method was developed in response to corruption within the Czech political system. According to Transparency International's Global Corruption Barometer in 2013, a majority of Czech citizens believed that political corruption in the country was widespread. In March 2011, Janeček founded the Endowment Fund Against Corruption (NFPK) whose stated objective was exposing prominent cases of corruption. It was suggested that the country's voting system itself needed to be revamped. The method was originally formulated in 2012 and it was beta tested the following year.

The method was created by the Czech mathematician and campaigner, Karel Janeček. He has also worked on projects like Prezident 21, an initiative focused helping voters understand the 2018 Czech presidential election.

Electoral System 
The system gives voters 2 types of vote - 'positive' votes, or 'upvotes', and 'negative' votes, or 'downvotes'. An upvote counts for a vote in favour of an individual or party, value +1, while a downvote counts as a value -1.

The number of votes is determined by the number of seats available and the number of ballot options. The total number of votes must be at least twice the number of seats needing to be filled, and the upper boundary is pegged to the number of ballot options. There must also be twice the number of positive votes given to each voter than negative votes.

Application 
Suppose we want to choose W winners out of T ≥ 4 candidates. A voting system follows the method described herein if and only if:

● Each voter is allowed to cast up to P ≥ W (plus) upvotes and up to M (minus) downvotes, where P ≥ 2M (i.e., number of upvotes has to be at least twice as large as the number of downvotes), and P ≤ T/2. In most cases, it's recommended to use P ≥ 2W (optimizing the effect of more votes) and P ≤ T/3.

● Each voter can cast no more than one vote for any candidate.

● The number of upvotes cast by each voter must be at least twice the number of downvotes cast.

● Each vote has the same absolute weight (+1 or -1). The W candidates receiving the greatest net sum of all votes win.

Hence, if there are two seats per district and a competing party nominate one or two candidates, voters may cast up to four upvotes and up to two downvotes, which they may distribute across all candidates in the district with only one vote per candidate. The same rules and rationale apply in single-winner elections.

Effects 
The system was designed with the multiple votes so that populist and extremist candidates would be elected less often. It was also designed so that voters would vote for multiple candidates who may not all be of the same political affiliation.

The use of a negative vote is also theorised to help reduce controversial candidates getting elected.

Official proposal 
The proposal to utilize the method and two-seat voting districts was submitted to the Czech government, and rejected. As of 2015, D21 has not been used to decide any major general elections in the country or elsewhere.

Development
In April 2015, D21 worked alongside Stanford University in creating digital ballots for participatory budgeting programs in several New York City districts. In addition to the actual ballots were experimental ones that tested the voting algorithm, which were said to showcase the system's increase in voter consensus as well as satisfaction.

D21 was one of many digital tools included in a 2016 study conducted by the Democratic Society of Scotland in regards to participatory budgeting. According to the study, participants found that the system increased voter engagement by making them think more carefully about decisions and furthermore helped clarify voter priorities. The system was considered for participatory budgeting experiments in Cascais, Portugal.

As part of Janeček's game, Prezident 21, the D21 system was introduced to publicise the system.

Use in municipalities

Říčany 
The D21 system was first used in March 2015 in Říčany in aim of testing and developing the new platform used for municipal decisions. The objective of choosing this method was to motivate people to take interest in what was happening in their municipality. It was suggested that system made it easier for them to get involved in making public decisions to raise general welfare and transparency of public procurements. The town allows for voting via the internet, and it has been used on several occasions since 2015.

New York 
The method was used in 2015 in the city of New York for participatory budgeting. It asked voters to distribute $38 million among various different projects proposed by the members of the community to improve the life in the city. 28 out of the 51 districts were involved.

Criticism 
Negative voting has been described as "ill-advised" in cases where it could be used against a religious or ethnic minority. Concerns have also been raised that the minus vote could encourage negative campaigning.

Political scientist Karel Sál has criticized D21 – Janeček method, claiming Janeček's assumption that a new electoral system alone could cleanse Czech politics is "at least naive" and further criticizes the system's basis on the ideals of rational choice theory. Sál also highlighted the technical difficulty of amending the Constitution of the Czech Republic in order to implement D21 into Czech elections.

One of the main Janeček's objective, he would like to achieve is to diminish extremist electoral strength. This point has been questioned by some specialists in political sciences. They claim that the existence and competitiveness of extremist parties is essential for a well functioning democracy for several reasons.

The system was also criticized by the political academic Perottino for its complexity compared to the proportional voting system used currently. He claimed it will be difficult for the electors to understand the new system and use it efficiently. In addition, it will be more complicated for the administration to determine the election results.

There is a theory that limitation of extremism on the political level can cause the mushrooming of the ideology in other forms. Those ways of extremism could become underground and be hardly monitored so potentially could be more dangerous.

See also

References 

Electoral systems
Election technology
Participatory democracy